A reredos is a large altarpiece, a screen, or decoration placed behind the altar in a church. It often includes religious images.

The term reredos may also be used for similar structures, if elaborate, in secular architecture, for example very grand carved chimneypieces. It also refers to a simple, low stone wall placed behind a hearth.

Description
A reredos can be made of stone, wood, metal, ivory, or a combination of materials. The images may be painted, carved, gilded, composed of mosaics, and/or embedded with niches for statues. Sometimes a tapestry or another fabric such as silk or velvet is used.

Derivation and history of the term
Reredos is derived through Middle English from the 14th-century Anglo-Norman areredos, which in turn is fromarere 'behind' +dos 'back', from Latin dorsum. (Despite its appearance, the first part of the word is not formed by doubling the prefix "re-", but by an archaic spelling of "rear".) In the 14th and 15th centuries the term referred generally to an open hearth of a fireplace or to a screen placed behind a table, then became nearly obsolete until it was revived in the 19th century.

Reredos vs retable
The term reredos is sometimes confused with the term retable. While a reredos generally forms or covers the wall behind an altar, a retable is placed either on the altar or immediately behind and attached to the altar. "Many altars have both a reredos and a retable." But this distinction may not always be observed. The retable may have become part of the reredos when an altar was moved away from the wall. For altars that are against the wall, the retable often sits on top of the altar, at the back, particularly when there is no reredos (in which case a dossal curtain or something similar is used instead of a reredos). The retable may hold flowers and candlesticks.

In French (and sometimes in English by confusing the terms), a reredos is called a retable; in Catalan a retaule, in Spanish a retablo, etc.

Examples from various churches

See also
 Altarpiece
 Iconostasis
 Retablo

References

External links 

 "Reredos" in the Encyclopædia Britannica

Altarpieces
Church architecture